Yeh Hai Bakrapur is a 2014 Indian Hindi-language social satire film set against the backdrop of rural India. The film was released in India on 9 May 2014.

Plot
A multi-layered film, it is based on the complex belief systems that prevail in Indian society and the conflicts that ensue thereon. The film's story revolves around the family of the Qureshis and their pet animal goat. Circumstances result in the goat acquiring rock star status in his village and beyond. Soon enough, people are fighting for a piece of the live goat, named sharukh. A rollicking climax ensues that provides the perfect finale to the mayhem that preceded it.

Cast
Anshuman Jha
Asif Basra
Suruchi Aulakh
Faiz Khan
Yoshika Verma
Shameem Khan
Amit Sial (cameo)
Utkarsh Majumdar (cameo)
Vinay Varma

Production and release 
The movie was screened at the 37th Göteborg International Film Festival. It was part of The Film Bazaar in the year 2012 as work in progress and it was also premiered at the Mumbai Academy of the Moving Image, 2013 Festival

Reception
Film Critic Taran Adarsh writing for Bollywood Hungama said tha the movie "employs a comic tone to tell a serious story. Armed with a simplistic, but innovative plot and an engaging screenplay."

Subhash K. Jha gave it 3 Stars and said that the movie is a scathing satire on blind faith. The movie is flush with fun, not necessarily intentional.

References

External links
 

2013 films
2010s Hindi-language films